Joseph Americus Margucci (September 5, 1921 – April 27, 1996) was an American football quarterback and halfback. 

Margucci was born in 1921 in New York City. He attended Franklin High School in Los Angeles. He played college football for Santa Ana Junior College in 1940 and 1941. He had planned to transfer to US, but with the United States' entry into World War II, Margucci entered the Army Air Forces. He played for the Santa Ana Army Air Base football team in 1942.

After the war, Margucci played professional football for the Los Angeles Bulldogs of the Pacific Coast Football League in 1946 and for the Detroit Lions of the National Football League (NFL) during the 1947 and 1948 seasons. He appeared in 23 games for the Lions, nine of them as a starter, rushed for 111 yards on 60 carries, and scored seven touchdowns. He also caught 46 passes for 575 yards and three touchdowns and completed 13 of 31 passes for 171 yards and a touchdown. He was waived by the Lions in September 1949.

After retiring as a player, Margucci worked as a coach. He began with four years as a football and basketball coach at Marshall High School in Los Angeles. In February 1953, he was hired as the backfield coach for the Denver Pioneers football program.

He died in 1996 in Encino, California.

References

1921 births
1996 deaths
American football halfbacks
American football quarterbacks
Denver Pioneers football coaches
Detroit Lions players
USC Trojans football players
High school basketball coaches in California
High school football coaches in California
Sportspeople from Brooklyn
Players of American football from New York City